Kolkata Monorail was a rail-based transit project planned for the city of Kolkata, West Bengal, India. This was the first proposed monorail in the country.

History

2004 & 2008 
The initial plan regarding the monorail was floated in 2004. In November that 2008, the first corridor (Budge Budge to Taratala) was finalised and the project was awarded to Andromeda Technologies, at a total cost of Rs. 1,200 crore, along with a German company, Derap AG & Helbling Technik AG and Fernmeldewerk Munchen Aubing, as technology and signalling partners, respectively. It was a build-own-operate public-private partnership model between Government of West Bengal and Andromeda Technologies Pvt. Ltd. The coaches were supposed to be initially imported from Germany, and later locally produced at Titagarh Wagons, Jessop and Texmaco. It was targeted that the phase 1 corridor would be operational by the next 4–5 years. The 2nd phase was a 52 km long route from Taratala to Rajarhat. But, the project was put on hold, due to lack of support from financial institution and unfavourable conditions, and Andromeda Technologies pulled out from it. The sanction of Kolkata Metro Line 6 in 2010-11 Railway Budget, led to the end of the monorail corridor, since both had almost the same alignment.

2014 
Scomi Engineering, expressed its intention to develop monorail system in the city, especially in New Town, with a budget of Rs. 2000-2500 crore.

2016 
In 2016, the plan was revived. A 70 km corridor from Budge Budge to Ruby on EM Bypass, via Budge Budge Trunk Road, New Alipore and Prince Anwar Shah Road, was proposed, to connect parts South 24 Parganas with the Kolkata Metro Line 6. The state industry promotion and development board approved the proposal submitted by Burn Standard. Thus, Burn Standard was the implementation agency of the project in PPP model with Government of West Bengal, at a cost of Rs. 4,216 crore. The Physical construction was planned to begin by March 2017 with a 3-year deadline. The project again came to a halt after few years.

2018 
West Bengal Housing & Infrastructure Development Corporation in October 2018 proposed monorail for New Town, the fast-growing planned satellite city of Kolkata and Salt Lake, another planned city adjacent to New Town. The feasibility study was conducted and cost evaluation of the project was done. The line would start at Ultandanga, and pass via Salt Lake Sector I & III and would end at New Town, thus connecting Kolkata Metro Line 2 and Kolkata Metro Line 6. The total cost of project was estimated at Rs. 4500 crore.

Current status 
Again in 2020, Braithwaite & Co., started talks with Government of West Bengal to setup monorail in the state. It is planned to run between Sealdah and Titagarh. The corridor is still in planning stage. In February 2020, New Town Kolkata Development Authority (NKDA) shelved the monorail proposal in and around New Town, and preferred to opt for a cheaper ropeway system.

Corridors 

: Approximate Length

See also
 Kolkata Metro
Kolkata Suburban Railway
Kolkata Light Rail Transit
Trams in Kolkata

References 

Transport in Kolkata
Proposed monorails in India
Companies based in Kolkata